The 2019–20 Primera División de El Salvador (also known as the Liga Pepsi) is the 21st season and 41st and 42nd Primera División tournament, El Salvador's top football division, since its establishment of an Apertura and Clausura format. Santa Tecla and TBD are the defending champions of both Apertura and Clausura tournaments respectively. The league will consist of 12 teams. There will be two seasons conducted under identical rules, with each team playing a home and away game against the other clubs for a total of 22 games per tournament. At the end of each half-season tournament, the top six teams in that tournament's regular season standings will take part in the playoffs.

The champions of Apertura or Clausura with the better aggregate record will qualify for the 2021 CONCACAF Champions League. The other champion, and the runner-up with the better aggregate record will qualify for the 2020 CONCACAF League. Should the same team win both tournaments, both runners-up will qualify for CONCACAF League. Should the final of both tournaments features the same 2 teams, the semifinalist with the better aggregate record will qualify for CONCACAF League.

Team information 

A total of 12 teams will contest the league, including 11 sides from the 2017–18 Primera División and 1 promoted from the 2018–19 Segunda División.

Firpo were relegated to 2019–20 Segunda División the previous season.

The relegated team was replaced by the 2018–19 Segunda División playoffs promotion winner. El Vencedor won the Apertura 2018, while San Pablo won the Clausura 2019 title, El Vencedor won the playoff match 6-5 on penalties after a 0-0 draw.

Promotion and relegation 

Promoted from Segunda División de Fútbol Salvadoreño as of June, 2019.

 Champions:  El Vencedor

Relegated to Segunda División de Fútbol Salvadoreño as of June, 2019.

 Last Place: Firpo

Personnel and sponsoring

Managerial changes

Before the start of the season

During the Apertura season

Between Apertura and Clausura seasons

During the Clausura season

Notable events

Change to Playoff
The league voted to change top qualify to the next round to the top six, with first and second spot qualifying directly to the semi finals, while teams from 3 to 6 have to playoff

Audaz giving their spot
On 28 of June, 2019 the only remaining member of the Audaz had taken the license from the previous board , he then gave charge to Independiente F.C.

Pasaquina their spot
On 3 of July, 2019 Pasaquina failed to meet the requirements that FESFUT had placed for clubs to be allowed to play in the Primera division, the club failed to pay off any outstanding debts. The club will be forced to sell their spot in Primera division.

New club registered in the Primera Division
On the 12th of July, 2019 a group of investors raised the capital and necessary funds to purchase the spot of Pasaquina, the club will be located the Ahuachapan department and will called Once Deportivo de Ahuachapan.

Clubs moving stadium
Several clubs announced that due to their home stadium not meeting new CONCACAF standards, minimal crowd numbers or/and their previous stadium not finishing their renovations in time.
Jocoro will be playing at Jose Ramon Flores Berrios which is located at the La Union.
FAS will be playing at the Estadio Cuscatlan which is located at San Salvador.
El Vencedor will be playing at the Estadio Sergio Torres Rivera which is located at Usulutan. Independiente announced that while their home stadium is going through renovations they would be playing at the Estadio Sergio Torres Rivera which is located at Usulutan.

Effects of the 2019–20 coronavirus pandemic
Since March, the season has been affected by the 2020 coronavirus pandemic.
On 13 March, following an emergency meeting between the Primera division, FESFUt, Segunda and Tecera division, it was unanimously decided to suspend professional football in El Salvador until at least 18 April 2020.

Season suspended, new champion and relegation 
In a historic meeting FESFUT declared to the public that the rest of Clausura 2020 season will be cancelled. Once Deportivo will be crowned champion due to leading the competition prior the suspension of the season, Along with Alianza (Apertura 2019 champion) and  FAS (Apertura 2019 runner up) qualified for CONCACAF Competition. Jocoro who were bottom of the aggregate table prior to the suspension of the season will be forced to play promotion/relegation playoff against Platense.

Clausura title retracted, no relegation 
At the FESFUT extraordinary meeting on 29 April 2020, it was decided that the Clausura 2020 season title originally awarded to Once Deportivo would be retracted and the title would not be awarded. However, they would remain the third representative of El Salvador in the 2020 CONCACAF League. Moreover, no promotion and relegation would be applied for this season.

FESFUT decided on 30 May 2020, to name Municipal Limeno, who were third in the aggregate table after Alianza and FAS, the final and third representative of El Salvador in the 2020 CONCACAF League, removing the spot awarded to Once Deportivo.

Notable death from Clausura 2019 season and 2020 Apertura season
The following people associated with the Primera Division have died between the middle of 2019 and middle of 2020.

 Óscar Enrique Sánchez (Guatemalan, ex Aguila player)
 Walter Martínez (Honduran, ex FAS player)
 Miguel Hermosillo (Chilean, ex Alianza player)
 Edwin Beltrán (ex Dragon player)
 Roger Mayorga (Nicaraguan, ex Aguila player)
 Francisco “Paco” Frances Ortiz (ex FAS, Aguila, Marte and Juventud Olimpica player)
 Victor Emmanuel Rodriguez (ex Chalatenango player)
 Leonardo Salas (Chilean,  ex Alianza player)
 Maximiliano Belloso Cubas Catan (ex FAS, Once Municipal and Alianza player)

Apertura

Results

Records 
 Best home records: Alianza FC (29 points out of 33 points)
 Worst home records: Once Deportivo  (4 points out of 33 points)
 Best away records : Alianza FC(19 points out of 33 points)
 Worst away records : Jocoro FC  (9 points out of 33 points)
 Most goals scored: Alianza and FAS (38 goals)
 Fewest goals scored: Once Deportivo  (21 goals)
 Fewest goals conceded : Alianza F.C. (18 goals)
 Most goals conceded : Once Deportivo (42 goals)

Top goalscorers

Scoring 
 First goal of the season:  Ricardinho for Santa Tecla against Chalatenango, 15 minutes (26 July 2019)
 First goal by a foreign player:  Ricardinho for Santa Tecla against Chalatenango, 15 minutes (26 July 2019)
 Fastest goal in a match: 2 minutes
  TBD for TBD against TBD (24 February 2019)
 Goal scored at the latest goal in a match: 90+2 minutes
  Armando Polo  goal for Santa Tecla against Chalatenango, (July 26, 2019)
 First penalty Kick of the season:  Ricardinho for Santa Tecla against Chalatenango, 15 minutes (26 July 2019)
 Widest winning margin: 5 goals
 Santa Tecla  5–0 Independiente (September 1, 2019)
 First hat-trick of the season: Bryan Gil for FAS against El Vencedor (October 28, 2019)
 First own goal of the season:  Franklin Campos (Once Deportivo) for Limeno (July 29, 2019)
 Most goals in a match: 7 goals
 Alianza F.C. 4-3 El Vencedor  (December 1, 2019)
 Most goals by one team in a match: 5 goals
 Santa Tecla  5–0 Independiente (September 1, 2019)
 Most goals in one half by one team: 3 goals
 TBD 3-1 (3-3) TBD (2nd half, January 24, 2019) 
 Most goals scored by losing team: 3 goals
 El Vencedor 3-4 Alianza F.C. (December 1, 2019)
 Most goals by one player in a single match: 4 goals
 Bryan Gil for FAS against El Vencedor (October 28, 2019)
 Players that scored a hat-trick': 
 Bryan Gil for FAS against El Vencedor (October 28, 2019)
  Raul Penaranda for Alianza against Limeno (November 4, 2019)
 Bryan Gil for FAS against Chalatenango (November 21, 2019)

Quarterfinals

First legs

Second legs

Sonsonate advances due to being 4th place in the league even though there was a tie of 1-1 aggregate. Will face Alianza in the semifinal.

Santa Tecla advances 3-2 on aggregate.

Semifinals

First legs

Second legs

Alianza advances 4-1 on aggregate.

1-1, FAS advances Due to be higher rank.

Final

Individual awards

Clausura

League table

Results

Records 
 Best home records: Once Deportivo  (11 points out of 18 points)
 Worst home records: A.D. Isidro Metapan  (6 points out of 18 points)
 Best away records : El Vencedor (12 points out of 18 points)
 Worst away records :   C.D. Chalatenango  (2 points out of 18 points)
 Most goals scored: Jocoro F.C.  (20 goals)
 Fewest goals scored: A.D. Isidro Metapan and C.D. Aguila  (5 goals)
 Fewest goals conceded : C.D. Aguila (6 goals)
 Most goals conceded : Jocoro F.C.   (19 goals)

Top goalscorers

Scoring 
 First goal of the season:  Diego Areco for Jocoro against Santa Tecla, 61 minutes (19 January 2020)
 First goal by a foreign player:  Diego Areco for Jocoro against Santa Tecla, 61 minutes (19 January 2020)
 Fastest goal in a match: 1 minutes
  Diego Areco for Jocoro against Independiente F.C. (6 February 2020)
 Goal scored at the latest point in a match: 90+4 minutes Josue Flores for Isidro Metapan against Aguila (1 March 2020)
 First penalty Kick of the season:  Diego Areco for Jocoro against Santa Tecla, 61 minutes (19 January 2020)
 Widest winning margin: 3 goals
 Jocoro  4-1 Chalatenango (February 2, 2020)
 First hat-trick of the season: None
 First own goal of the season:  Kevin Martinez (Jocoro) for Once Deportivo (February 23, 2020)
 Most goals in a match: 5 goals
 Jocoro  4-1 Chalatenango (February 2, 2020)  Sonsonate  3-2 Jocoro (January 26, 2020)
 Most goals by one team in a match: 4 goals
 Jocoro  4-1 Chalatenango (February 2, 2020)
 Most goals in one half by one team: 3 goals
 Jocoro  3-0 (4-1) Chalatenango (2nd half, February 2, 2020) 
 Most goals scored by losing team: 2 goals
 Jocoro 2-3 Sonsonate  (26 January 2020)  Once Deportivo 2–3 Jocoro  (23 February 2020)  Jocoro 2-3 El Vencedor  (1 March 2020)
 Most goals by one player in a single match: 2 goals
 Osvaldo Blanco for Alianza F.C. against C.D. Sonsonate (January 23, 2020)
 Edwin Sanchez for C.D. Municipal Limeno against Alianza F.C. (February 6, 2020)
 Diego Areco for Jocoro against Independiente F.C. (February 6, 2020)
 Tardelius Pena for Independiente F.C. against Jocoro  (February 6, 2020)
 David Boquin for C.D. Sonsonate against Santa Tecla (February 6, 2020)
 Diego Areco for Jocoro against C.D. Municipal Limeno (February 9, 2020)
  Ricardinho for Santa Tecla against Chalatenango (February 15, 2020)
  Mauricio Cuéllar for FAS against Jocoro (February 16, 2020)
 Jose Luis Rodriguez for Jocoro against Once Deportivo (February 23, 2020)
 Diego Areco for Jocoro against El Vencedor  (1 March 2020)
 Michel Mercado for El Vencedor against Jocoro  (1 March 2020)
  Bryan Paz for Once Deportivo against Chalatenango (9 March 2020) 
 Players that scored a hat-trick': 
None

Final 
The final round of matches and the final were cancelled due to the coronavirus pandemic. The title was subsequently awarded to Once Deportivo, who finished on top of the points table after the eleven rounds that were played.

List of foreign players in the league 
This is a list of foreign players in the 2019–20 season. The following players:

 Have played at least one game for the respective club.
 Have not been capped for the El Salvador national football team on any level, independently from the birthplace

A new rule was introduced this season, that clubs can have four foreign players per club and can only add a new player if there is an injury or a player is released and it is before the close of the season transfer window. 

Águila
  Javier Lezcano 
  Joaquín Verges
  Andrés Quejada
  Gonzalo da Luz 
  José Vizcarra
  Waldemar Acosta

Alianza
  Herlbert Enrique Soto 
  Raúl Peñaranda 
  Cristian Olivera 
  Hector Ramos 
  Maximiliano Freitas
  Felipe Ponce Ramírez
  José Pablo “Rulo” Varela
  Oswaldo Blanco

Chalatenango
  Craig Foster 
  Eduardo Hurtado 
  Luis Arboleda 
  Luis Cabezas Chavarría 
  Elkin Mosquera
  Wilson Palacios
  Maximiliano Martinez
  Marco Luis González

El Vencedor
  Boris Yasser Polo Mosquera 
  Diomer Hinestroza 
  Michell Mercado 
  Joel Almeida
  Jhon Machado
  Neimer Miranda

FAS
  Guillermo Stradella 
  Jeison Quiñones  
  Bryan Gil Hurtado 
  Eder Moscoso
  Raúl Peñaranda
   Hugo Bargas
  Diego Castellanos

Independiente
   Luciano Sanhuezo 
  Camilo Gómez 
  Tardelius Pena
  Eduardo Rodriguez
  Jomoul Francois
  Fredrick Ogangan

Isidro Metapán
  Lucas Dos Santos 
  Gersain Caicedo 
  Jhonny Rios 
  Jomal Williams 
  Jeison Murillo
  Arbey Mosquera

Jocoro
  Carlos Del Giorno 
  Jackson Palacio 
  Jorge Cáceres 
  Diego Areco 
  Jose Luis Rodriguez
  Jamal Jack
  Luis Paradela

Limeño
  Miguel Murillo 
  Clayvin Zuniga 
  Rodrigo de Brito 
  Zé Paulo 
  Samuel Jiménez
  Hugo Alexis Oviedo Jara
  Emerson Lalin

Once Deportivo
  Neimer Miranda  
  Alonso Umaña  
  Marcó Tulio Gallego  
  Juan Jose Vasquez  
   Marco Granados
  Jeison Quiñones
  Edgar Solis
  Luis Fernando Copete

Sonsonate
  David Boquín
  Jonathan Ramirez
  Beitar Córdoba
  Daley Mena

Santa Tecla
  Joel Almeida  
  Ricardinho
  Armando Polo  
  Brayan Obregon   
  Rodrigo de Brito
  Alejandro Dautt
  Juan Aimar

 (player released during the Apertura season)
 (player released between the Apertura and Clausura seasons)
 (player released during the Clausura season)
 (player naturalised for the Clausura season)

References 

Primera División de Fútbol Profesional seasons
El Salvador
1
El Salvador